Jacob Levi Brown (born March 11, 1987) is the Quarterbacks coach at Valdosta State University. Brown was formerly the offensive coordinator for the Faulkner University American football team. Brown was an American football graduate assistant at Troy University and former quarterback. He was drafted by the Buffalo Bills in the seventh round of the 2010 NFL Draft. He played college football at Troy.

College career
Brown played for the University of Richmond from 2005 to 2006. He only started three games at Richmond, and after the 2006 season, transferred to Troy University. After redshirting during the 2007 season, Brown started in 2008 with the Trojans. He has many Trojan passing records. In 2009, he broke the Troy and Sunbelt Conference record by passing for 4,254 yards. He finished second in the nation in passing yards in 2009, and Brown was the Sun Belt Conference Player of the Year.

Troy statistics

Source:

Professional career

Buffalo Bills
After much speculation that the Buffalo Bills were going to select a quarterback in the 2010 NFL Draft, Brown was made the newest Bills quarterback in the seventh round (209th overall). He was cut by the Bills September 4, 2010, on final cuts. The Bills opted to keep Brian Brohm as their third quarterback and Levi was not signed to the practice squad. However, following the release of Trent Edwards on September 27, Buffalo resigned Brown, and he served as the team's third quarterback.

Brown was waived in final cuts prior to the 2011 season, after the Bills signed Brad Smith and Tyler Thigpen as Ryan Fitzpatrick's backup quarterbacks; because he spent most of the year as the third-string quarterback (a position that was not considered a part of the active roster until 2011), he was eligible for, and was placed on, the practice squad.

Brown was cut from the practice squad on September 13, 2011.

Saskatchewan Roughriders
On March 20, 2012, it was announced that Brown had been signed by the Saskatchewan Roughriders. On June 17, 2013, it was announced that Brown has been released by the Saskatchewan Roughriders.

Winnipeg Blue Bombers
On September 4, 2013, it was announced that Brown had been signed by the Winnipeg Blue Bombers and added to their practice roster.

Statistics

Source:

Coaching career
Brown currently serves as the quarterbacks coach for the Valdosta State University American football team. Brown was a graduate assistant coach at Troy University, his alma mater in Troy, Alabama, where Brown earned bachelor's and master's degrees. He returned to work with his former mentor and new head coach Neal Brown. Brown worked with the Quarterbacks and mentored current Troy University starter Brandon Silvers. Brown was the offensive coordinator at Faulkner University, Montgomery Alabama before accepting the quarterback coach job at Valdosta State University.

References

External links
Saskatchewan Roughriders bio
Buffalo Bills bio
Troy Trojans football bio
Levi Brown's Twitter page

1987 births
Living people
People from Mount Juliet, Tennessee
American football quarterbacks
Canadian football quarterbacks
American players of Canadian football
Richmond Spiders football players
Troy Trojans football players
Buffalo Bills players
Players of American football from Tennessee
Saskatchewan Roughriders players
Winnipeg Blue Bombers players
Troy Trojans football coaches
Faulkner Eagles football coaches
Valdosta State Blazers football coaches